Nirmal Minz is Bishop Emeritus of the Protestant North Western Gossner Evangelical Lutheran Church Society who served as bishop from 1980 through 1996.

As a Scholar, Nirmal Minz is an authority on Tribal and indigenous people and culture.  Minz views tribes as being the indigenous people of India and opines that moves to alienate their landholding will cause destruction to the planet Earth itself.  As for the attitudes of the indigenous peoples, Minz believed that the accommodative nature, communitarian ownership of properties and decision by consensus did not find favour with the colonial British India which even continues to this day with the powers that be.  Professor K. P. Aleaz in A Tribal Theology from a Tribal World - View considers Nirmal Minz along with Renthy Keitzer and Timotheas Hembrom as the Theologians with focus on Tribal cultures and ideologies.

The Gossner College, Ranchi was founded by Nirmal Minz in 1971 where stories abound about its students topping the ranks.

Studies and Academics

Graduate
Nirmal pursued graduate studies earning a Bachelor of Arts in 1950 at Patna University.  After discerning his avocation towards priesthood, he was sent for spiritual formation to the Serampore College, a constituent College of the nation's first University, the Senate of Serampore College (University) where he studied from 1951-1953 earning the graduate degree Bachelor of Divinity.  One of Nirmal's companions at the college was K. V. Mathew of the Malankara Mar Thoma Syrian Church.

Postgraduate
After availing study leave from the Church Society, Minz went to Minnesota where he pursued a dual degree programme, one in theology and the other in anthropology at the Luther Seminary and the University of Minnesota respectively earning both a Master of Theology specialising in Systematic Theology and a Master of Arts degree specialising in Anthropology.  Minz's postgraduation theses were entitled The Messiah Or the Prophet in Nativistic Movements (for M. Th. degree) and the other A Christian Community in a Culture (for M. A. degree).

Doctoral
Minz availed study leave once again and pursued doctoral studies at the University of Chicago where he earned a doctorate degree in Systematic Theology in 1968 after submitting a doctoral dissertation entitled Mahatma Gandhi and Hindu-Christian Dialogue.

Writings

Books
1957, A Christian Community in a Culture,
1957, The Messiah Or the Prophet in Nativistic Movements,
1960, The Industrial Parish,
1968, A Memorandum on the Adivasi Problems in Central Tribal Belt of India and Their Permanent Solutions (with Joel Lakra),
1970, Mahatma Gandhi and Hindu-Christian Dialogue,
1997, Rise Up, My People, and Claim the Promise: The Gospel Among the Tribes of India,

Articles
1961, Approach to Tribal Communities Today (with Dilbar Hans and B. M. Pugh),
1980, Transforming Effects of Christianity on the Tribals of Chotanagpur
1987, A Theological Interpretation of the Tribal Reality in India,
1994, Dalit-Tribal: A Search for a Common Ideology

Honours
In 2005, the Jesuit, Anand Amaladass in Indian Christian Thinkers (Volume I) included Nirmal Minz's life story highlighting Minz's contribution.

Similarly, in 2007, the Jesuit Indian Social Institute, New Delhi published a fetschrift in honour of Nirmal Minz with articles by the legendary Old Testament Scholar K. V. Mathew, Josepha Mariyānusa Kujūra, Sonajharia Minz and others

In 2017, he got Bhasha Samman by Sahitya Akademi for his works in Kurukh language.

References

Further reading
 
 
 

Indian Lutherans
Indian Christian theologians
20th-century Indian Christian clergy
20th-century Indian translators
People from Gumla district
Senate of Serampore College (University) alumni
Patna University alumni
Luther Seminary alumni
University of Minnesota alumni
Chicago State University alumni
University of Chicago Divinity School alumni
1927 births
Living people
Academic staff of the Senate of Serampore College (University)
Leonard Theological College alumni